Longnecks & Short Stories is the third studio album by American country music artist Mark Chesnutt. It was released in 1992 on MCA Records, and like its predecessor Too Cold at Home, it was certified platinum in the United States for sales of one million copies. Four singles were released from this album, all of which were Top Ten hits on the Billboard Hot Country Songs charts: "Old Flames Have New Names" (#5), "I'll Think of Something" (#1), "Bubba Shot the Jukebox" and "Ol' Country" (both #4).

"I'll Think of Something" was originally a Top Ten country hit in 1974 for Hank Williams, Jr., who recorded it on his album Living Proof. In addition, "It's Not Over (If I'm Not over You)" was originally recorded by Reba McEntire on her 1984 album My Kind of Country. Chesnutt later included the song on his 1997 album Thank God for Believers, releasing it as a single from that album in 1998.

Track listing

Personnel
David Briggs - piano
Mark Chesnutt - lead vocals
Terry Crisp - steel guitar
Pat Flynn – acoustic guitar
Paul Franklin – steel guitar
Rob Hajacos – fiddle
Owen Hale – drums
George Jones – vocals on "Talking to Hank"
Paul Leim – drums
Steve Nathan – keyboards
Lynn Peterzell – percussion
Hargus "Pig" Robbins - piano
Brent Rowan – electric guitar, acoustic guitar
Wayne Toups – squeezebox
Biff Watson – acoustic guitar
Bob Wray – bass guitar

Background vocals
Curtis "Mr. Harmony" Young
Jim Lauderdale
Bergen White
Alison Krauss on track 4
Wendy Suits Johnson
Jana King
Keith Morris
Wayne Toups
Dennis Wilson
Vince Gill on track 4

Strings by the Nashville String Machine, conducted by Carl Gorodetzky and arranged by Bergen White.

Chart performance

References

1992 albums
Mark Chesnutt albums
MCA Records albums
Albums produced by Mark Wright (record producer)